Chase Wright may refer to:

Chase Wright (baseball) (born 1983), American baseball player
Chase Wright (golfer) (born 1989), American golfer
Chase Wright Vanek (born 1996), American actress